Arthur Brown Jr. (born June 17, 1990) is a former American football linebacker. He was drafted by the Baltimore Ravens in the second round of the 2013 NFL Draft. He played college football at Kansas State University, where he earned All-American honors. Brown has also played for the Jacksonville Jaguars, New York Jets, and Seattle Seahawks.

Early years
Brown was born in Wichita, Kansas.  He attended Wichita High School East in Wichita, and played high school football for the Wichita East Blue Aces. As a sophomore and junior he was a consensus first-team Class 6A all-state selection and as a junior he was named to the Wichita Eagle "Second 11" all-state team.  Brown registered 154 tackles (111 solo) and 7 sacks as a sophomore starter at linebacker in 2005, but also rushed for 462 yards at fullback. As a junior, Brown had 158 tackles, eight sacks and an interception.

Brown attended the 2006 Oklahoma summer camp where he ran the 40-yard dash in 4.68 seconds. He also had an impressive performance at the 2007 U.S. Army Combine, and announced in June 2007 that he would participate in the 2008 U.S. Army All-American Bowl.

Pete Carroll said that Brown was the best linebacker that he had seen in seven years—referring to D. J. Williams—, while Bob Stoops predicted Brown would win the Dick Butkus Award two times.  Primarily because of the Brown brothers, ESPNU nationally televised a matchup between East and Dodge City High School on September 7, 2007.  Following the 2007 season, USA Today recognized him as a high school All-American.

Recruiting
Brown was considered the top prospect to come out of Wichita since Barry Sanders and Kamerion Wimbley.  In September 2007, Brown announced that the schools he planned to visit were Alabama, Louisiana State, North Carolina, Miami (FL), and Southern California. Oklahoma, Kansas State, Georgia Tech, Florida, and Georgia, whom he had already visited, were still on his list of ten.  Though some predicted Brown would ultimately choose Oklahoma, he eliminated OU along with Alabama, Georgia Tech, and Georgia in early November. On December 5, he eliminated Kansas State from his list. Brown was down to Louisiana State, North Carolina, Miami (FL), Southern California, and Florida, but with no clear front runner, when he held a press conference on December 17 at the Kansas Hall of Fame to announce his decision. He decided to attend the University of Miami.

College career
Brown initially attended the University of Miami, and played for the Miami Hurricanes football team.  He struggled during his freshman year despite being Miami's top-rated recruit.  Hurricanes coach Randy Shannon decided to move Brown from weakside to inside linebacker for his sophomore season, saying he began flourishing in the new role toward the end of the 2008 season.  "The last two weeks of the season he was phenomenal at middle linebacker on scout team.  Like Ray Lewis, when he first got here he was outside and he wasn't very good," said Shannon.

Brown left the Miami program in February 2010.  Brown, along with his brother Bryce, were named in a report from Yahoo! Sports alleging that student-athletes, coaches and administrators were aware and received impermissible benefits from ex-booster and convicted felon Nevin Shapiro.

He subsequently enrolled at Kansas State University in May 2010, and became a member of the Kansas State Wildcats football team.  Brown's first season at Kansas State was very productive as he had 95 tackles, 2 sacks and 1 interception. Brown also contributed some key plays during the Wildcats 10-2 season, one such play included getting an interception off Heisman winning quarterback Robert Griffin III to set up game-winning field goal as the Wildcats beat #15 Baylor Bears. He was the first player last season to pick Griffin, ending his streak at 110 passing attempts. Brown also had a 12 tackle game beating the Iowa State Cyclones as Kansas State finished the regular season 10-2. Brown was named Big 12 newcomer of the year, becoming the tenth Wildcat to do so and the fourth in the past five years.

In the 2012 season, Brown won the 2012 Big 12 Conference Defensive Player of the Year award, after registering 91 tackles, 2 interceptions (one was returned for a touchdown), six tackles for loss and one sack.  He is the third Kansas State player to win the defensive player of the year award as named by the conference, after Mark Simoneau in 1999, and Terence Newman in 2002.

Professional career

Baltimore Ravens
Projected a second-round selection, Brown was ranked as the No. 4 outside linebacker available in the 2013 NFL Draft. He is compared to Daryl Washington, because "neither linebacker has the ideal size for their position, but they compensate with sideline-to-sideline speed". In the 2013 NFL Draft, the Baltimore Ravens picked Brown after their star middle linebacker Ray Lewis retired.

Brown underwent hernia surgery during the off-season a few weeks following the draft. Arthur was placed on injured reserve on January 1, 2015. On September 3, 2016, he was released by the Ravens.

Jacksonville Jaguars
The Jacksonville Jaguars claimed Brown off waivers on September 4, 2016. He was released by the Jaguars on December 6, 2016.

New York Jets
Brown was claimed off waivers by the Jets on December 7, 2016. He was released on December 19, 2016.

Seattle Seahawks
On March 17, 2017, Brown signed with the Seattle Seahawks. He was waived on July 31, 2017.

San Antonio Commanders (AAF)
On January 4, 2019, Brown signed with the San Antonio Commanders of the AAF.

On January 30, 2019, Brown was released by the Commanders as part of the final training camp cuts.

Personal life
Arthur is the son of Arthur Brown, Sr. and Lelonnie Brown. His uncle Lawrence Pete is a former Detroit Lions player, while his younger brother Bryce is a former NFL running back.

According to Jeremy Crabtree of Rivals.com, the Browns were the first brothers ever to both be ranked five-star recruits.

References

External links
Kansas State Wildcats bio
Miami Hurricanes bio

1990 births
Living people
Players of American football from Wichita, Kansas
American football linebackers
Miami Hurricanes football players
Kansas State Wildcats football players
Baltimore Ravens players
Jacksonville Jaguars players
New York Jets players
Seattle Seahawks players
San Antonio Commanders players